Cape Bernacchi is a rocky cape between Bernacchi Bay and New Harbour on the coast of Victoria Land. Discovered by the Discovery expedition, 1901–04, under Scott, and named by him for Louis C. Bernacchi, physicist with the expedition.

Headlands of Victoria Land
Scott Coast